Mataram Utama Manggala Football Club (previously known as Mataram Utama Football Club) is an Indonesian football team based in Yogyakarta, Special Region of Yogyakarta. They currently compete in Liga 3.

History
Mataram Utama was established by PT Mataram Utama Perkasa on 27 June 2021, Mataram Utama FC was officially introduced as a new member of the Football Association of Indonesia in Yogyakarta, Manggala SIWO Mataram Utama, appointed Erwan Hendarwanto as head coach, This club is managed by a sports journalist in Special Region of Yogyakarta. Some of the players work as journalists such as FX Harminanto, former student national team and captain of PSIM Yogyakarta. Mataram Utama will appear in the competition which will take place in Yogyakarta and participate in Liga 3. The mission is to provide coaching for young and early age players through the Mataram Utama Football Academy. The emergence of Mataram Utama FC is also a sign of the development of soccer in Special Region of Yogyakarta which has attracted the attention of many parties.

On 15 November 2021, Mataram Utama FC made league match debut in a 3–2 win against Persig Gunungkidul at the Dwi Windu Stadium, in the next match, Mataram Utama FC will face a team with a big name, Persiba Bantul. Five days later, in that match, they had their second match in a 0–0 draw against Persiba Bantul. On 22 December 2021, 2021 Liga 3 Special Region of Yogyakarta has been held and Mataram Utama FC has become the champion to represent the province at the national level after they won 3–1 over Sleman United in the final at the Tridadi Stadium.

On 7 February 2022, in the national round match, they managed to get their first win after a 2–0 win over Citeureup Raya at the Galuh Stadium, Ciamis Regency. three days later, they had their second match in a 6–0 big win against Persisam United. On 13 February 2022, they closed the match in the group stage round of 64 in a 2–2 draw against PS Sandeq, with this result, they qualified for the second round as winners Group F. Mataram Utama won their first two matches in the round of 32 to make them qualify for the round of 16, in the first match on 16 February, Mataram Utama won 3–1 over Gasko Kolaka and won 2–1 over Persak Kebumen three days later. On 7 March 2022, in the Round of 16, Mataram Utama drew 1–1 against PSGC Ciamis at the Gelora Delta Stadium, Sidoarjo in the first match.

On 13 March 2022, Mataram Utama officially promoted to Liga 2 next season for the first time in the club's history and also at the same time qualified for the semifinals of 2021–22 Liga 3 after in the last match of Group DD won 4–1 over Persidago Gorontalo. But during the semifinals, they suffered a 6–1 defeat to Putra Delta Sidoarjo, and fail to final match.

On 30 May 2022, during the 2022 PSSI Ordinary Congress, the club handed over their senior team to a group of investors, who subsequently changed their name to Nusantara United FC. Mataram Utama as a club still exists, however they now shift their attention towards only youth development and their football academy, with the club seemingly refraining from fielding another senior team for the 2022–23 season.

For the 2022-23 Liga 3 season, Mataram Utama have re-enrolled themselves into the 2022 Liga 3 Special Region of Yogyakarta, now playing under the name Mataram Utama Manggala.

Coaching staff

Players

Current squad

Honours
 Liga 3 Yogyakarta
 Champion: 2021

References

Sport in Yogyakarta
Football clubs in the Special Region of Yogyakarta
Football clubs in Indonesia
Association football clubs established in 2021
2021 establishments in Indonesia